is a Japanese web manga series written and illustrated by Migihara. It was serialized on Shueisha's online platform Manga Mee from November 2018 (and on Shōnen Jump+ from January 2020) to October 2020. The story follows Rintarou Tsuda, a high school student with the ability to see longevity, and Umi Kanzaki, a high school girl with less than 100 days left to live. Migihara described the series as "a story about the battle against longevity and fate".

Plot
Rintarou Tsuda is a high school student with the capacity to predict the lifespan of living things. However, he has struggled with his abilities since he was a child, and he can only gradually observe the people around him without being able to assist them. He discovers one day that Umi Kanzaki, his childhood buddy and the one who has feelings for him, has less than 100 days to live.

During the concept stage, Umi Kanzaki was supposed to die after 100 days, and the entire tale would be about "how to live in 100 days", but due to the gloom, the story was adjusted to be more comical romantic while keeping the original core theme.

Characters

Rintarou Tsuda is a very emotional boy. His name is derived from the fact that the author has a friend with the nickname "Tarou".

Tarou's childhood friend. Tarou confesses his affections to Umi in the first chapter of the series, and she accepts him, but Tarou quickly finds that Umi only has roughly 100 days left to live. Despite her feminine appearance, Umi is a neutral figure who pays little attention to others.

Publication
Written and illustrated by Migihara, Kimi ga Shinu Made Ato Hyaku Nichi started in Shueisha's online platform Manga Mee on November 1, 2018; it also started publishing on Shōnen Jump+ on January 23, 2020. The series finished on October 1, 2020. Shueisha collected its chapters in six tankōbon volumes, released from November 25, 2019, to November 25, 2020.

Volume list

References

External links 
 
 

2018 webcomic debuts
2020 webcomic endings
Japanese webcomics
Romantic comedy anime and manga
Shōjo manga
Shueisha manga
Webcomics in print